was a Japanese company who published video games. The most notable titles published by the company were the manga-based Hana no Keiji: Kumo no Kanata ni and Super Snakey (known in North America as WildSnake), a game endorsed by Alexey Pajitnov.

Video games

Game Boy
Super Snakey (1994)
Nada Asatarou no Powerful Mahjong: Tsugi no Itte 100 Dai (1994)
Otogi Banashi Taisen (1995)

Super Famicom
Mahjong Sengoku Monogatari (1994)
Hana no Keiji: Kumo no Kanata ni (1994)
Zenkoku Kōkō Soccer (1994)
Super Snakey (1994)
Zenkoku Kōkō Soccer 2 (1995)

See also

List of fighting game companies
List of video games based on anime or manga

External links
Yojigen at MobyGames

Defunct video game companies of Japan
Video game publishers